Francesco Lamperti (11 March 1811 or 1813 – 1 May 1892) was an Italian singing teacher.

Biography
A native of Savona, Lamperti attended the Milan Conservatory where, beginning in 1850, he taught for a quarter of a century.  He was director at the Teatro Filodrammatico in Lodi. In 1875, he left the school and began to teach as a private tutor.  Among his pupils were Sophie Cruvelli, Emma Albani, Gottardo Aldighieri, Désirée Artôt, Sona Aslanova, Lillie Berg, David Bispham, Italo Campanini, Virgilio Collini, Samuel Silas Curry, Franz Ferenczy, Friederike Grün, Teresa Stolz, Marie van Zandt, Maria Waldmann, Herbert Witherspoon, Tecla Vigna, and Lizzie Graham.  His methods were very similar to older Italian methods, and he wrote a number of treatises on the subject.

Award
Lamperti was created a Commander of the Crown of Italy for his services to music.

Personal life
His son Giovanni Battista Lamperti (1839–1910) was also a well-known voice teacher.
He died in Como, Lombard on 1 May 1892

Publications
 Guida teorico-pratica-elementare per lo studio del canto. Milan: Ricordi, 1864.
 Studi di bravura per soprano. Translated as Studies in bravura singing for the soprano voice. New York: 1875.
 Esercizi giornalieri per soprano o mezzo-soprano
 L'arte del canto. Milan: Ricordi, 1883.
 Osservazioni e consigli sul trillo
 Solfeggi. Translated as Art of Singing by J. C. Griffith. London: Ricordi, 1877. Revised edition: New York: Edward Schuberth, 1890. (There also may be an edition by G. Schirmer).

References

Further reading
 David Ewen, Encyclopedia of the Opera: New Enlarged Edition.  New York; Hill and Wang, 1963.
 Baker's Biographical Dictionary of Musicians, (Nicolas Slonimsky, Ed.) New York: G. Schirmer, 1958.

External links
 

1810s births
1892 deaths
Italian music educators
People from Savona
Milan Conservatory alumni
Academic staff of Milan Conservatory
Voice teachers
19th-century Italian musicians
Year of birth uncertain